Melton Constable is a village and civil parish in the English county of Norfolk. The population had increased to 618 at the 2011 Census. For the purposes of local government, it falls within the district of North Norfolk. The village sits on fairly high ground south-west of Holt.

The place-name Melton Constable is first attested in the Domesday Book of 1086, where it appears as Maeltuna. This may mean either 'middle town' or 'mill town'. There is a reference to 'Constabularius de Melton' in 1197, as the land was held by the constable of the bishop of Norwich.

Melton Constable Hall is regarded as the finest specimen of the Christopher Wren style of house.

The parish church of St Peter's, Melton Constable is located within Melton Constable park; it contains many monuments to the Astley family, who formerly resided at Melton Constable Hall.

The village was struck by an F0/T1 tornado on 23 November 1981, as part of the record-breaking nationwide tornado outbreak on that day.

The River Bure has its source in the parish, just south of the village, roughly half-way between the village and the parish church.

Railway

Melton Constable reached its heyday about 1911; in the census of that year, it had a population of 1,157. It was a new town built in 1880s at the junction of four railway lines, which came from Cromer, North Walsham, King's Lynn and Norwich and linked Norfolk to the Midlands. The Midland & Great Northern Joint Railway (M&GNJR)'s main workshops and factory were also situated in the village, helping to give it the character of a rural industrialised village (rather similar to Woodford Halse in Northamptonshire). The workshops were often called the Crewe Works of North Norfolk. When in M&GNJR hands, the works built 19 steam locomotives. 

Under LNER ownership, the works was gradually degraded until 1934 when it closed completely. Between 1959 and 1964, British Railways chose to close the lines, withdrawing both passenger and goods services from Melton Constable, which resulted in the slow decline of the village; it now lies stranded in the middle of a vast agricultural area which uses other forms of transport. In 1971, the station was demolished and the works were converted into an industrial estate; several railway buildings are extant and have found other uses.

The railways may eventually return to Melton Constable in future, as part of the Norfolk Orbital Railway's plans to restore former railway lines.

Burgh Parva
The parish of Melton Constable includes the deserted former parish of Burgh Parva, notable for its ruined church and tin tabernacle replacement.

References

External links

Villages in Norfolk
Railway towns in England
Civil parishes in Norfolk
North Norfolk